Simon C. Hitchcock (c. 1801 – September 27, 1878 in Binghamton, Broome County, New York) was an American book publisher and politician from New York.

Life
He married Euphrasia Jackson (1804–1897).

He was a member of the New York State Assembly (Madison Co.) in 1842.

He was a member of the New York State Senate (20th D.) in 1854 and 1855. Afterwards he removed to Binghamton.

In 1862, he was appointed as Collector of Internal Revenue for the 26th District of New York.

He and his wife were buried at the Evergreen Cemetery in Cazenovia.

Author Charles Dudley Warner was his nephew.

Sources
The New York Civil List compiled by Franklin Benjamin Hough (pg. 137, 142, 226 and 281; Weed, Parsons and Co., 1858)
The National Almanac (1863; pg. 129)
Cazenovia publishers at RootsWeb
OUR SPECIAL WASHINGTON DISPATCHES;...TAX APPOINTMENTS FOR NEW-YORK... in NYT on September 1, 1862

External links

1800s births
1878 deaths
Democratic Party members of the New York State Assembly
Democratic Party New York (state) state senators
People from Cazenovia, New York
Politicians from Binghamton, New York
19th-century American politicians